The Winnipeg Saints were a Manitoba Junior Hockey League team based in Winnipeg, Manitoba.  The team was known for most of its existence as the St. Boniface Saints and exists today as the Virden Oil Capitals.

History

The St. Boniface Saints were formed in 1967 when the Winnipeg Rangers were purchased by a local group and relocated to St. Boniface.  The Saints won three Turnbull Cups as Manitoba Junior 'A' champions (1971, 1981, and 1994), and the Anavet Cup in 1971.

The team became the Winnipeg Saints in 2000 after moving to the Dakota Community Centre in St. Vital, which would be their home until the end of the 2009–2010 season.  They played one season out of St. Adolphe arena and then returned to Winnipeg, playing out of the St. James Civic Centre for the 2011–2012 season. In the spring of 2012, the Saints franchise was purchased by a group from Virden and subsequently relocated to the southwestern Manitoba town for the start of the 2012–13 season.

Notable Saints alumni include Mike Ridley, Colton Orr, Russ Romaniuk, and Travis Hamonic.

List of championships

Season-by-season record
Note: GP = Games Played, W = Wins, L = Losses, T = Ties, OTL = Overtime Losses, GF = Goals for, GA = Goals against

Playoffs
1971 Won League, Won Man/Sask Championship, Lost Abbott Cup
St. Boniface Saints defeated West Kildonan North Stars 4-games-to-3
St. Boniface Saints defeated St. James Canadians 4-games-to-none
St. Boniface Saints defeated Kenora Muskies 4-games-to-none MJHL CHAMPIONS
St. Boniface Saints defeated Weyburn Red Wings (SJHL) 4-games-to-2 MAN/SASK CHAMPIONS
Red Deer Rustlers (AJHL) defeated St. Boniface Saints 4-games-to-none
1972 Lost Quarter-final
West Kildonan North Stars defeated St. Boniface Saints 4-games-to-1
1973 Lost Semi-final
St. Boniface Saints defeated West Kildonan North Stars 9-points-to-7
St. James Canadians defeated St. Boniface Saints 4-games-to-none
1974 Lost Semi-final
St. Boniface Saints defeated St. James Canadians 4-games-to-2
West Kildonan North Stars defeated St. Boniface Saints 4-games-to-none
1975 Lost Quarter-final
St. James Canadians defeated St. Boniface Saints 4-games-to-none
1976 Lost Quarter-final
St. James Canadians defeated St. Boniface Saints 4-games-to-1
1977 Lost Quarter-final
Kenora Thistles defeated St. Boniface Saints 4-games-to-2
1978 Lost Quarter-final
Kildonan North Stars defeated St. Boniface Saints 4-games-to-1
1979 Lost Semi-final
St. Boniface Saints defeated St. James Canadians 4-games-to-1
Kildonan North Stars defeated St. Boniface Saints 4-games-to-none
1980 Lost Quarter-final
Kildonan North Stars defeated St. Boniface Saints 4-games-to-2
1981 Won League, Won Turnbull Cup, Lost Anavet Cup
St. Boniface Saints defeated Kenora Thistles 4-games-to-none
St. Boniface Saints defeated St. James Canadians 4-games-to-1
St. Boniface Saints defeated Selkirk Steelers 4-games-to-1 MJHL CHAMPIONS
St. Boniface Saints defeated Thompson King Miners (NJHL) 3-games-to-none TURNBULL CUP CHAMPIONS
Prince Albert Raiders (SJHL) defeated St. Boniface Saints 4-games-to-1
1982 Lost Semi-final
St. Boniface Saints defeated St. James Canadians 4-games-to-2
Fort Garry Blues defeated St. Boniface Saints 4-games-to-none
1983 Lost Final
St. Boniface Saints defeated Kildonan North Stars 4-games-to-none
St. Boniface Saints defeated Fort Garry Blues 4-games-to-2
Dauphin Kings defeated St. Boniface Saints 4-games-to-1
1984 Lost Quarter-final
Kildonan North Stars defeated St. Boniface Saints 4-games-to-none
1985 Lost Quarter-final
Selkirk Steelers defeated St. Boniface Saints 4-games-to-1
1986 Lost Quarter-final
St. James Canadians defeated St. Boniface Saints 4-games-to-3
1987 Lost Semi-final
St. Boniface Saints defeated Steinbach Hawks 4-games-to-none
Winnipeg South Blues defeated St. Boniface Saints 4-games-to-none
1988 Lost Quarter-final
St. James Canadians defeated St. Boniface Saints 4-games-to-1
1989 Lost Quarter-final
Kildonan North Stars defeated St. Boniface Saints 4-games-to-none
1990 DNQ
1991 Lost Quarter-final
St. James Canadians defeated St. Boniface Saints 4-games-to-3
1992 Lost Quarter-final
Winnipeg South Blues defeated St. Boniface Saints 4-games-to-2
1993 Lost Final
St. Boniface Saints defeated Selkirk Steelers 4-games-to-none
St. Boniface Saints defeated Winnipeg South Blues 4-games-to-1
Dauphin Kings defeated St. Boniface Saints 4-games-to-none
1994 Won League, Lost Anavet Cup
St. Boniface Saints defeated Southeast Blades 4-games-to-1
St. Boniface Saints defeated St. James Canadians 4-games-to-1
St. Boniface Saints defeated Winkler Flyers 4-games-to-2 MJHL CHAMPIONS
Weyburn Red Wings (SJHL) defeated St. Boniface Saints 4-games-to-3
1995 Lost Semi-final
St. Boniface Saints defeated Southeast Blades 4-games-to-none
Winnipeg South Blues defeated St. Boniface Saints 4-games-to-3
1996 Lost Quarter-final
Winnipeg South Blues defeated St. Boniface Saints 4-games-to-3
1997 Lost Quarter-final
Selkirk Steelers defeated St. Boniface Saints 4-games-to-3
1998 Lost Quarter-final
Winnipeg South Blues defeated St. Boniface Saints 4-games-to-3
1999 Lost Semi-final
St. Boniface Saints defeated St. James Canadians 4-games-to-2
Winnipeg South Blues defeated St. Boniface Saints 4-games-to-3
2000 DNQ
2001 Lost Quarter-final
Winnipeg South Blues defeated Winnipeg Saints 4-games-to-3
2002 DNQ
2003 DNQ
2004 Lost Semi-final
Winnipeg Saints defeated Winkler Flyers 4-games-to-2
Selkirk Steelers defeated Winnipeg Saints 4-games-to-2
2005 Lost Quarter-final
Selkirk Steelers defeated Winnipeg Saints 4-games-to-1
2006 Lost Quarter-final
Selkirk Steelers defeated Winnipeg Saints 4-games-to-2
2007 Lost Semi-final
Winnipeg Saints defeated Winnipeg South Blues 4-games-to-3
Selkirk Steelers defeated Winnipeg Saints 4-games-to-none
2008 Lost Final
Winnipeg Saints defeated Winnipeg South Blues 4-games-to-1
Winnipeg Saints defeated Winkler Flyers 4-games-to-1
Portage Terriers defeated Winnipeg Saints 4-games-to-1
2009 Lost Semi-final
Winnipeg Saints defeated Neepawa Natives 4-games-to-none
Selkirk Steelers defeated Winnipeg Saints 4-games-to-2
2010 Lost Final
Winnipeg Saints defeated Winnipeg South Blues 4-games-to-none
Winnipeg Saints defeated Winkler Flyers 4-games-to-none
Dauphin Kings defeated Winnipeg Saints 4-games-to-none
2011 Lost Quarter-final
Selkirk Steelers defeated Winnipeg Saints 4-games-to-1
2012 Lost Final
Winnipeg Saints defeated Dauphin Kings 4-games-to-1
Winnipeg Saints defeated OCN Blizzard 4-games-to-2
Portage Terriers defeated Winnipeg Saints 4-games-to-1

See also
List of ice hockey teams in Manitoba

External links
Winnipeg Saints Official Website

References 

Ice hockey teams in Winnipeg
Defunct Manitoba Junior Hockey League teams